Daniel Rosenfeld (born 9 May 1989), better known by his stage/online name C418 (pronounced "see four eighteen"), is a German musician, producer and sound engineer, best known as the composer and sound designer for the sandbox video game Minecraft. He has also written and produced the theme for Beyond Stranger Things and the soundtrack for the Steam release of Cookie Clicker. He has also DJed for American rock band Anamanaguchi.

Life and career
Rosenfeld was born in East Germany in 1989, the son of a Soviet-born father of German descent working as a goldsmith and a German mother. He learned to create music on early versions of Schism Tracker (a popular clone of Impulse Tracker) and Ableton Live in the early 2000s, both rudimentary tools at the time. It was his brother, Harry Rosenfeld, who introduced him to music composition through Ableton Live, commenting that "even an idiot" can successfully create music with it. His brother was also known as C818, from which he chose the name C418, claiming that the name is "really cryptic and doesn't actually mean anything".

2002–2009: Career beginnings 

After being introduced to music production by Rosenfeld's brother, Daniel started releasing music on Bandcamp after Danny Baranowsky suggested releasing his music on the site.

In 2007, Rosenfeld started a blog known as "Blödsinn am Mittwoch" (English: "Silliness on Wednesday"), where he posted a new song every week. This was around the same time when he became interested in game development and audio, which resulted in him joining the indie game development forum TIGSource, where he became involved with numerous smaller games and game developers (among them, Rosenfeld unofficially released the soundtracks of Zombie Dog in Crazyland and Mubbly Tower on his site and old blog). Later, Rosenfeld started making albums and releasing them on the blog and also Bandcamp, as a hobby.

His first release was the 2007 EP BPS, and shortly thereafter, in 2008, he challenged himself to make a studio album as quickly as possible, for fun, prioritizing quantity over quality, The Whatever Director's Cut was released on his blog as BAM #30 and on his Bandcamp, where it was available until it was removed in 2013, due to Rosenfeld's dislike of the album.

Also in 2008, Rosenfeld released Mixes, a 25-minute medley containing remixes of songs previously posted on the blog, also were released the EP Sine, and his second studio album Zweitonegoismus, the album expressed his feelings working in an assembly line factory. Rosenfeld showed the album to his co-worker prior to releasing it, in which they asked "why the hell [he was] still working there".

2009–2013: Minecraft, becoming a freelance composer, and One 

In early 2009, Rosenfeld began collaborating with the Minecraft creator Markus "Notch" Persson through an internet forum called TIGSource. Rosenfeld was responsible for the sound effects and music in Persson's work-in-progress video game Minecraft. The sound engine in the still young Java game was not very powerful, so Rosenfeld had to be creative in his approach to creating sound effects and music.

In January 2010, fourth studio album A Cobblers Tee Thug, a collaborative work with Rosenfeld's friend Sohnemann was released. Made in the few days they spent together in the New Year, and they challenged each other, for fun, to make a full-length LP together in those days.

The album circle was released in March 2010, originally created in 2008, it was intended as the soundtrack for an unpublished indie game bearing the same name, created by an unknown developer.

In August 2010, Rosenfeld released Life Changing Moments Seem Minor in Pictures. The album was recorded while Rosenfeld was still residing within Germany, and at the time of releasing the album, Rosenfeld was requested to work for military services after quitting his job, in which he instead did other labour. The album also contains the original soundtrack to Ezo, a game Rosenfeld independently developed for Ludum Dare.

In 2011 a series of compilation albums with songs from various projects were released on Bandcamp for free, including Little Things, I Forgot Something, Didn't I. (a B-side to 72 Minutes of Fame), and Seven Years of Server Data.

While still working on Minecraft as a freelance artist, Rosenfeld was not on staff at Mojang Studios, the company behind Minecraft. Rosenfeld still owns the rights to all his music in the game, and has released two albums featuring songs from the Minecraft soundtrack. The first soundtrack, Minecraft – Volume Alpha, was digitally released on 4 March 2011 on his Bandcamp page.

Later that year, when Minecraft became available to the general public as an early access title, it rapidly became popular. Rosenfeld, who up until that point had worked at an assembly line, could now pursue music as his primary source of income. This inspired his 2011 studio album, 72 Minutes of Fame. The content of this album mostly revolves around this lifestyle-defining moment in Rosenfeld's life. This album was the first of Rosenfeld's works to have a (limited) physical release. The Guardian has compared his compositions to those of Brian Eno and Erik Satie because of their minimalistic, ambient quality.

Almost half a year later, production on a documentary of the development of Minecraft started, titled Minecraft: The Story of Mojang. Rosenfeld was requested to create the soundtrack for this documentary, which was included on his 2012 album, One.

2013–2016: Minecraft - Volume Beta, 0x10c, and other independent projects 

On 9 November 2013, Rosenfeld released the second album of the official soundtrack for Minecraft, titled Minecraft - Volume Beta. Many of the new songs were being added into features of the game that were not present when the first batch of music was produced; i.e. the Nether or the End. In 2020, the soundtrack was released in physical format with Ghostly International and reprints of the Minecraft - Volume Alpha physical releases were also released. The Volume Beta releases consisted of a double CD edition of the album, a vinyl record which came in black and a red "fire" splatter color, and a limited edition of the vinyl pressed on a magenta translucent material which was at first exclusive to Europe but was later re-pressed internationally.

Persson and Rosenfeld worked together again after Minecrafts success on the creation of a new game, titled 0x10c. The game was never released, with Persson halting production indefinitely in August 2013.

In 2014, Rosenfeld released an EP containing the music made for 0x10c. It was released digitally with little publicity; Rosenfeld simply sent out a tweet stating that it was available.

In 2015, Rosenfeld released 148, which much like 72 Minutes of Fame carried a significant amount of personal content, albeit slightly more hidden under lyrics and effects.

Later that year, Minecraft - Volume Alpha soundtrack was released on a physical format on Ghostly International. This release consisted of a regular CD edition of the album, a vinyl edition which came with a code for a digital copy of the album, and a limited edition of the album pressed on green translucent vinyl.

In the same year, Rosenfeld hinted at a potential upcoming third album for Minecraft soundtrack, stating "I'll still work on Minecraft, so there’ll probably be another album". In 2017, Rosenfeld confirmed the future release, claiming the album is "still far from done".

2016–2021: 2 Years of Failure, Excursions, and further independent music 

Rosenfeld released 2 Years of Failure in 2016, a Bandcamp exclusive compilation album of music made for failed projects or songs that could not fit anywhere else. Several songs in this album were made for an abandoned game Rosenfeld described as having a "...Japanese puzzle exchange..." vibe. This album also contains the original soundtrack for Crayon Physics. Most notably, this album contains C418's remix of the Stranger Things theme song, which had staggering popularity in 2018. It was the most played song on Rosenfeld's personal SoundCloud page until it was removed along with several other tracks due to a lapsed SoundCloud Pro subscription.

He released Dief in 2017. The songs of this album were created and used as a soundtrack for an informative talk given at the Game Developers Conference 2017 by Teddy Dief.

After the "Update Aquatic" Minecraft update of 2018, three new songs were added to the game as underwater music. These songs – "Dragon Fish", "Shuniji", "Axolotl" – were released by Rosenfeld respectively on August 9, November 10, and December 12, 2018, on Spotify as singles. All of them are to be included in the third album. Rosenfeld confirmed on Twitter that the third album will not be called "Minecraft: Volume Gamma" following the pattern from the 2 Minecraft albums before it.

On 20 July 2018, Rosenfeld announced a studio album, Excursions, with the release of its lead single, "Beton". Its second single, "Thunderbird", was released on 20 August 2018. The album was released on 7 September 2018. Multiple tracks on Excursions are named after cafes in Austin, Texas, where Rosenfeld currently lives as of 2017.

Excursions was released on CD and a limited vinyl LP by Driftless Recordings in January 2019 and reprinted in 2021 for CD and Vinyl.

In 2020, after the announcement of the addition of Steve to the game, his work was not included in Super Smash Bros. Ultimate for various undisclosed reasons, though one explanation given was it being too calm for fighting. Tracks other composers made for Minecraft Legacy Console Edition, Minecraft Dungeons, and Minecraft Earth were added instead.

During an interview in January 2021 with Anthony Fantano, when asked if a potential third installment in the soundtrack was in the works, Rosenfeld responded with "I have something, I consider it finished, but things have become complicated especially as Minecraft is now a big property. So I don't know".

In May 2021, Rosenfeld released Branching Out. The EP contains the soundtrack to Branch, a video conferencing software by Dayton Mills.

2021–present: Life Changing Moments Seem Minor in Pictures remaster, Ivy Road and Cookie Clicker 
On 16 June 2021, Rosenfeld announced on Twitter that his album from 11 years prior, Life Changing Moments Seem Minor in Pictures would be remastered and released onto major streaming platforms. The album prior to the re-release was only available on Bandcamp.

In July 2021, Rosenfeld, along with Davey Wreden, Karla Zimonja and Annapurna Interactive announced the launch of Ivy Road, a game studio founded by Wreden and co-founded by Zimonja. The studio is working on an untitled game, in which Rosenfeld is composing the music for.

Following the announcement of the launch of Ivy Road, in August 2021 Rosenfeld announced that he had worked on a soundtrack for the 2013 game Cookie Clicker as it is being released onto Steam. In September 2021, Rosenfeld released the soundtrack.

On 13 March 2022, Rosenfeld performed a DJ set with Anamanaguchi for their Scott Pilgrim vs. The World: The Game Soundtrack tour.

In August 2022, Northway Games released I Was a Teenage Exocolonist. Rosenfeld and other fellow musical artists collaborated in composing the soundtrack to the game. His contribution was the piece "Quiet."

Discography

 Life Changing Moments Seem Minor in Pictures (2010)
 Minecraft – Volume Alpha (2011)
 72 Minutes of Fame (2011)
 One (2012)
 Minecraft – Volume Beta (2013)
 148 (2015)
 Dief (2017)
 Excursions (2018)

Filmography

References

External links

 
 

1989 births
Ableton Live users
Ambient musicians
Audio engineers
Chiptune musicians
German male musicians
German people of Russian descent
German expatriates in the United States
Living people
Tracker musicians
Video game musicians
Video game composers